Promicromonospora umidemergens is a Gram-positive bacterium from the genus Promicromonospora which has been isolated from indoor wall material in Berlin, Germany.

References

Further reading

External links
Type strain of Promicromonospora umidemergens at BacDive -  the Bacterial Diversity Metadatabase	

Micrococcales
Bacteria described in 2010